Erik Ronald "Sura-Pelle" Pettersson (16 April 1935 – 6 March 2010) was a Swedish ice hockey player. He played 252 international games for Sweden between 1955 and 1967, including thirteen World Championships and three Olympic Games. Between 1951 and 1967 Pettersson played for Surahammars IF, Södertälje SK and Västra Frölunda IF. He won the Swedish championship twice, in 1956 with Södertälje and in 1965 with Västra Frölunda. He won Guldpucken in 1959–60 as the most valuable player in Swedish Championship playoffs.

After suffering a career-ending injury in 1967, Pettersson took on the role as head coach for the Swedish national junior team from 1968 to 1974, the Swedish national senior team from 1974 to 1976, and the Norwegian national men's team from 1978 to 1981. He was inducted into the IIHF Hall of Fame in 2004, and his jersey #14 was retired by Västra Frölunda in 2002.

Early life 
Pettersson was born in Surahammar, a rural industrial town where the name Ronald was unusual, thus the locals nicknamed him Collman, after the famous actor Ronald Colman. Pettersson was a natural athletic talent, in his youth he played tennis and table tennis with good results. He started playing bandy as a goalkeeper since his skating was of poor quality, as he developed his skating ability he moved to the outfield. He played his first ice hockey game with Surahammars IF's senior team in an exhibition game against Avesta BK during the autumn of 1952.

Playing career
During the 1952–53 season Pettersson debuted at age 17 for his hometown team Surahammars IF in Division 1, the highest level of ice hockey in Sweden at the time. He played five games, scoring no goals. The following season Pettersson played ten games, scoring nine goals, only one goal shy of the team's scoring leader Arne Holmgren. Surahammar were relegated to Division 2 for the 1954–55 season, where Pettersson set a new club record as he scored 23 goals in seven games. In 1955 Pettersson left Surahammar as he was enlisted to do conscript service in the Swedish Navy, stationed in Stockholm's archipelago. In Stockholm he was supposed to sign a contract with Djurgårdens IF, but rival club Södertälje SK were faster with the transfer papers and Pettersson signed with them instead. In 1956 he won the Swedish Championship with Södertälje, scoring one goal in the decisive game against Djurgården which Södertälje won 3–1.

International play

Pettersson played for Sweden in all thirteen international championships between 1955 and 1967, totaling 252 games for the national team. Pettersson, a right winger, together with centre Nisse Nilsson and left winger Lars Erik Lundvall, formed the legendary ungdomskedjan (youth line), one of the most successful and considered as Tre Kronor's best line ever.

He made his debut for Juniorkronorna in February 1954, and for Tre Kronor when they played two games against Norway in Stockholm on 26 and 27 November 1954. He was selected to Tre Kronor's roster for the 1955 World Championship, he scored his first tournament goal, assisted by Sven "Tumba" Johansson, in a 9–0 win against Poland in the last game of the championship.

Playing style
Pettersson was a hard-working right winger, who played an efficient game and made every minute on the ice count. He was a fast skater, and had a well-developed goal-scoring ability. He was considered a team player, not a crowd pleaser or a man for newspaper headlines, despite his natural athletic talent. Like a chess player he always thought one step ahead, knowing what to do when he received the puck, he was sly, cunning, coldblooded and could always do unexpected moves. His passing game was of high quality and precision, he was a good shooter but rarely used powerful shots, instead he preferred well placed precision shots which had a remarkable ability to find the net.

Legacy
With his 252 games Pettersson is ranked fourth all-time in games played for Tre Kronor. His feat was long considered an unbreakable record, but he was surpassed by Thomas Rundqvist in 1993 and later by Jonas Bergqvist and Jörgen Jönsson.

He was inducted to the International Ice Hockey Federation's (IIHF) Hall of Fame in 2004.

He became the fiftieth ice hockey player to receive Stora Grabbars Märke.

His jersey #14 is retired by Frölunda. In 2003 he was inducted as an honour member in Surahammars IF.

Career statistics

Regular season and playoffs

International

Football career

Pettersson had a two-year stint with IFK Göteborg in Allsvenskan, the top-level football league in Sweden. When Pettersson was acquired by Västra Frölunda IF in 1960, Västra Frölunda's manager Anders Bernmar had talked IFK Göteborg into helping Västra Frölunda with the acquisition, after convincing them that Pettersson not only was a good ice hockey player but a good football player too. During the 1960 season, his first season with IFK, he scored two goals in eight matches in Allsvenskan, and fourteen goals in seven friendly matches. IFK Göteborg finished eight in Allsvenskan. The following season Pettersson scored two goals in six matches in Allsvenskan and matched the numbers in friendly matches. IFK Göteborg won bronze this season, Västra Frölunda had won promotion to Division 1 in ice hockey and Pettersson did not play football again.

Notes

References

External links

1935 births
2010 deaths
People from Surahammar Municipality
Swedish ice hockey right wingers
Swedish ice hockey coaches
Frölunda HC players
Olympic ice hockey players of Sweden
Ice hockey players at the 1956 Winter Olympics
Ice hockey players at the 1960 Winter Olympics
Ice hockey players at the 1964 Winter Olympics
IIHF Hall of Fame inductees
Norway men's national ice hockey team coaches
Olympic silver medalists for Sweden
Olympic medalists in ice hockey
Medalists at the 1964 Winter Olympics
Swedish footballers
IFK Göteborg players
Association footballers not categorized by position
Sportspeople from Västmanland County